Off the Hook is the second studio album by American R&B group Xscape. It was released on July 11, 1995, through So So Def Recordings and Sony Music Entertainment. The album was produced by Jermaine Dupri, Organized Noize, and Daryl Simmons and features a guest appearance by MC Lyte. Off the Hook was preceded by the release of four singles — "Feels So Good", "Who Can I Run To" and "Can't Hang/Do You Want To".

The album debuted at number twenty-three on the US Billboard 200 and number three on the Top R&B/Hip-Hop Albums chart. It was eventually certified Platinum by the Recording Industry Association of America (RIAA) on November 16, 1995  and won the 1996 Soul Train Music Award for R&B/Soul Album of the Year – Group, Band or Duo.

Critical reception

In his review for Allmusic, senior editor Stephen Thomas Erlewine called the album "an improvement on their first record, demonstrating gains both in terms of music and lyrics [...] While they are still sexual on their second album, Off the Hook, it doesn't overwhelm the music as it did on their debut. Recording with producers Dupri, Daryl Simmons, and Organized Noize on various tracks, the group has developed into impressive musicians, with a thorough grasp of slow, seductive soul and slick funk. Off the Hook may run a little long – the 12 songs clock in at well over an hour – but the record proves that Xscape has staying power."

Track listing

Notes
 denotes co-producer

Credits and personnel

Musicians
 Preston Crump, LaMarquis "Mark" Jefferson, Zachary Scott – bass
 Randy Hutchinson – drums
 Tommy Martin – guitar
 Bruno Speight – guitar
 Delores Major – violin
 Lomax Spaulding – guitar
 Ralph Stacy – bass

Production
 Executive producers: Jermaine Dupri, Michael Mauldin,
 Producers: Jermaine Dupri, Carl-So-Lowe, Organized Noize, Daryl Simmons
 Vocal assistance: Organized Noize, Xscape
 Engineers: Thom "TK" Kidd, Phil Tan, Bernasky Wall
 Assistant engineers: John Frye, Thomas Rickert
 Mixing: Mick Guzauski, Daryl Simmons, Phil Tan
 Mixing assistance: John Frye, Kevin Lively, Alex Lowe, Thomas Rickert
 Programming: Felipe Elgueta, John "J.R." Robinson, Glen Woodward

Charts

Weekly charts

Year-end charts

Certifications

References

1995 albums
Xscape (group) albums
Albums produced by Jermaine Dupri
Albums produced by Organized Noize